"Maybe She's Human" is a song recorded by American country music artist Kathy Mattea.  It was released in November 1994 as the third single from the album Walking Away a Winner.  The song reached No. 34 on the Billboard Hot Country Singles & Tracks chart.  The song was written by Kent Robbins and Layng Martine Jr.

Chart performance

References

1994 singles
1994 songs
Kathy Mattea songs
Songs written by Layng Martine Jr.
Songs written by Kent Robbins
Song recordings produced by Josh Leo
Mercury Records singles